The  is a museum located in the city of  Nisshin, Aichi, Japan.  It is owned and operated by the Transportation Bureau of the City of Nagoya.

The museum houses a collection of Nagoya's old subway trains and trams. The museum visitors can experience driving Nagoya's present-day subway trains and older models of streetcars using PlayStation-style computer simulator. Model train displays and staff uniforms and caps complement the exhibit. Outside the museum is a giant tunneling shield excavator, which was used to dig Nagoya's subway tunnels.

Access by public transport is Akaike Station on the Tsurumai Line.

External links 

 Nagoya City Tram & Subway Museum

Museums in Aichi Prefecture
Railway museums in Japan
Nisshin, Aichi
Museums established in 2000
2000 establishments in Japan